Laxness is a crater on Mercury, located near the north pole.  It was named by the IAU in 2013, after Icelandic writer Halldór Laxness.

S band radar data from the Arecibo Observatory collected between 1999 and 2005 indicates a radar-bright area along the southern interior of Laxness, which is probably indicative of a water ice deposit, and lies within the permanently shadowed part of the crater.

Fuller crater is southeast of Laxness.  Both lie in the northern part of the Goethe Basin.

References

Impact craters on Mercury